Nutty Professor II: The Klumps is a 2000 American science fiction comedy film directed by Peter Segal. It is the sequel to the 1996 film The Nutty Professor.

In contrast to the previous film, subplots which are centered on the parents of protagonist Sherman Klump occupy a substantial part of the film. Members of the Klump family, including Sherman's parents, also provide an increased level of comic relief.

Plot

Professor Sherman Klump has created a new de-aging formula. He is also in love with DNA researcher, Denise Gaines, developer of a method to isolate genetic material. Despite his good fortune, Sherman's major problem is his id alter ego, Buddy Love. He is still ingrained inside him and has begun to periodically take control of his body. Buddy's antics culminate in the corruption of Sherman's attempted proposal to Denise into a mortifying display of perversion.

Determined to be rid of Buddy permanently, and despite his assistant, Jason, warning him of potential consequences, Sherman uses Denise's methodology to isolate and remove the DNA where Buddy has manifested. However, the Buddy genetic material grows into a sentient being when a hair from Jason's Basset Hound, Buster, accidentally lands in it. Sherman apologizes to Denise and they become engaged. Later, Dean Richmond informs them that Phleer Pharmaceuticals has offered Wellman College $150 million for the youth formula.

Sherman and Denise then encounter the newly reformed Buddy at a movie theater. Buddy pickpockets Sherman and learns of the $150 million offer. He subsequently visits the pharmaceutical company, making a rival bid of $149 million with Leanne Guilford, President of Acquisitions, for the youth formula. Sherman learns that the extraction has altered his body chemistry and that he is losing his intelligence. Realizing he needs to keep the youth formula out of Buddy's hands, Sherman stashes it at his parents'.

Sherman's sexually frustrated father Cletus accidentally drinks some of the youth formula. He goes out for a night on the town and attempts to seduce his wife and Sherman's mother, Anna, but she is horrified. Buddy witnesses Cletus changing and realizes that the youth formula is being stored in the Klump household. Meanwhile, Sherman's condition causes him to act like a fool in front of Denise's parents, concerning her.

Buddy steals some of the youth formulae from the Klump household, filling the vial the rest of the way with fertilizer. This sabotage causes chaos at a demonstration the next day as Petey, the male hamster Sherman uses to demonstrate the formula, mutates into a giant monster who violates Richmond as he is trying to escape under a fur coat, as Petey confuses him for Molly, the female hamster that escaped during the event. The humiliated and enraged Richmond fires Sherman, who soon learns from Jason that his brain's deterioration has worsened, so he decides to break up with Denise. Cletus consoles a depressed Sherman, and inadvertently gives him the solution to regaining his intelligence: getting Buddy Love back into his DNA.

Sherman quickly works on a newer, much more potent formula while his mental faculties allow him. Richmond confronts him about Buddy's actions, believing that they are working together. Sherman leaves with Richmond and a tennis ball covered in the youth formula and heads to a presentation at Phleer Pharmaceuticals that Buddy is giving about the youth formula. Meanwhile, a worried Denise discovers what has happened and that Sherman's brain damage is progressing. With Cletus' help, Denise goes after him. Sherman takes advantage of the canine DNA crossed with Buddy's and throws the tennis ball to distract him. Buddy catches the ball in his mouth, and the youth formula transforms him back into a glowing mass of sentient genetic material.

Sherman chases the genetic material, intent on drinking it to correct his condition. However, it evaporates on the edge of a fountain before he can. Cletus and Denise arrive too late to save him, and Denise breaks into tears, which hit the genetic material and fall into the fountain. As they go to leave, Sherman looks into the fountain, remarking that it is "pretty". Seeing the water is glowing, Denise realizes the genetic material has reconstituted thanks to her tears and that if Sherman drinks the fountain water, he will be restored to normal. When he drinks it, he is able to restore his intelligence.

Sherman and Denise later get married, while Cletus and Anna reconcile with each other.

Cast

 Eddie Murphy as Professor Sherman Klump / Buddy Love / Papa Cletus Klump / Young Papa Cletus Klump / Ernie Klump Sr. / Mama Anna Klump / Grandma Ida Jenson / Lance Perkins
 Janet Jackson as Denise Gaines-Klump
 Larry Miller as Dean Richmond
 John Ales as Jason
 Richard Gant as Mr. Gaines
 Anna Maria Horsford as Mrs. Gaines
 Melinda McGraw as Leanne Guilford 
 Jamal Mixon as Ernie Klump Jr.
 Wanda Sykes as Chantal
 Freda Payne as Claudine
 Nikki Cox as Miss Taylor Stamos (Credited as Bright Student)
 Chris Elliott as Restaurant Manager
 Earl Boen as Dr. Knoll
 Charles Napier as Four Star General
 Gabriel Williams as Isaac

Additionally, Kathleen Freeman makes an uncredited appearance as Denise's neighbor who witnesses Sherman proposing to her. Freeman previously portrayed Millie Lemmon in the original 1963 film.

Music

Reception

Box office
Nutty Professor II: The Klumps grossed over $42.5 million in its opening weekend and went on to a total gross of over $123.3 million in the United States beating out Thomas and the Magic Railroad. It earned an additional $43 million in other territories, for a worldwide total of $166.3 million worldwide.

Critical response
Unlike the first film, Nutty Professor II: The Klumps received unfavorable reviews from critics. Adjectives such as "obnoxious", "lowbrow", "bloated", and "unfunny" cropped up frequently in reviews. On Rotten Tomatoes, the film has an approval rating of 27% and an average rating of 4.5/10, based on reviews from 89 critics. The site's consensus states that "While Eddie Murphy is still hilarious as the entire Klump family, the movie falls apart because of uneven pacing, a poor script, and skits that rely on being gross rather than funny." On Metacritic, the film has a score of 38 out of 100, a score that indicates generally unfavorable reviews, based on reviews from 34 critics. Audiences surveyed by CinemaScore gave the film an average grade of "A−" on a scale of A+ to F.

Salon.com's reviewer gave the movie one of its few positive notices, and offered the praise "cheerfully vulgar".
The New Yorker's Anthony Lane was particularly severe; in addition to hating the film, he dismissed Murphy's playing of multiple characters as "minstrelling", and charged the actor with "at once feeding us what we like and despising us for swallowing it." Most critics gave a generally negative assessment of the movie with at least a nod towards Murphy's versatility and comic talent.

Roger Ebert gave the film three stars, noting that while it was "raucous" and "scatological," the film overall proved to be "very funny" and "never less than amazing."
Variety's Joe Leydon wrote: "Be prepared to laugh less at a lot more of the same thing in this overbearing but underwhelming sequel."

See also

 The Nutty Professor (film series)

References

External links

 
 
 
 
 

2000 films
2000s fantasy comedy films
2000 romantic comedy films
2000s science fiction comedy films
African-American comedy films
American science fiction comedy films
American fantasy comedy films
American romantic comedy films
American sequel films
2000s English-language films
Films about dysfunctional families
Films about scientists
American films about revenge
Films directed by Peter Segal
Films produced by Brian Grazer
Films shot in South Carolina
Imagine Entertainment films
The Nutty Professor
Universal Pictures films
Films scored by David Newman
Films with screenplays by Chris Weitz
Films with screenplays by Paul Weitz
Films with screenplays by Barry W. Blaustein
Films with screenplays by David Sheffield
2000s American films